Norman Wesley Sanderson Jr. (born July 7, 1951) is a Republican member of the North Carolina General Assembly, representing the state's second Senate district, which includes Carteret, Craven, Pamlico counties. Sanderson was formerly a member of the North Carolina General Assembly, representing the state's third House district, which included parts of Craven and Pamlico counties.

Political career
In 2021, he proposed anti-transgender legislation which would prohibit medical professionals from performing gender confirmation surgery on those under the age of 21. The legislation would also mandate that state employees inform parents when their children display "gender nonconformity."

2006
In 2006, Sanderson challenged incumbent Republican Jean Preston in the primary for the North Carolina Senate District 2 seat. Preston defeated Sanderson, 79.34%–20.66%.

2008
Sanderson next decided to challenge incumbent Democrat Alice Graham Underhill for the NC House District 3 seat. Neither faced any primary that year. Underhill narrowly beat Sanderson, 49.92%–47.65%.

2010
Sanderson faced a rematch with Alice Graham Underhill and Libertarian challenger Herb Sobel in 2010. This time, Sanderson won the seat by a large margin 63.69%–34.24%–2.08%.

2012

When incumbent Republican Jean Preston announced that she would not seek re-election to the NC Senate District Two seat, Sanderson announced that he would run for the position. In the primary, he faced Randy Ramsey, a businessman from Beaufort, and Ken Jones who is mayor of Pine Knoll Shores. Sanderson won the primary with 51.86% of the vote. He goes on to face Democrat Greg Muse in the general election.

References

External links

NC General Assembly official profile
Campaign website
Project Vote Smart profile
Follow the Money - Norman W. Sanderson
2010 and 2008 campaign contributions

|-

|-

Living people
1951 births
People from Lumberton, North Carolina
People from Pamlico County, North Carolina
21st-century American politicians
North Carolina Republicans
Members of the North Carolina House of Representatives
Republican Party members of the North Carolina House of Representatives
North Carolina state senators
Republican Party North Carolina state senators